CRI Vientiane at 93.0 FM is a radio station in Vientiane, Laos. It is part of China Radio International.  It broadcasts primarily in English. According to China Radio International, this is the third overseas radio station launch after CRI Nairobi Kenya 91.9 FM.

External links
 Official CRI Vientiane 93.0 schedule

References

Radio stations in Laos
China Radio International